Anjatha Nenjangal is a 1981 Indian Tamil-language film directed by R. Thyagarajan for Devar Films. The film stars Suman, K. R. Vijaya, Saritha and Vanitha Krishnachandran. It was released on 26 October 1981.

Plot

Cast 
Suman
K. R. Vijaya
Jaishankar
Saritha
Raveendran
Tiger Prabhakar
Vanitha Krishnachandran
Karate Mani

Soundtrack 
The music was composed by Shankar–Ganesh.
"En Kaathal Odangal Karai Serum Nerangal" -
"Maappillaikku Oru Machcham Irukku" -
"Saappida Vaanga Ada Ungalathaanga" -
 "Thanna Thaanaa Thaalam Thaana" -

Reception 
The film was a commercial success.

References

External links 
 

1980s Tamil-language films
1981 films
Films directed by R. Thyagarajan (director)
Films scored by Shankar–Ganesh